Oak Court Mall is an enclosed shopping mall located in Memphis, Tennessee, United States. Opened in 1988, the mall features Macy's and Dillard's as its anchor stores.

History

The mall began as a freestanding, 3-story Goldsmith's, a Memphis-based department store, in 1961. In the early 1970s, Goldsmith's constructed a 3-story structure immediately to the west of the existing store. The upper two levels of this structure served as parking, while the bottom level was connected to the first floor of the existing store and served as additional retail space. In the late 1970s, Goldsmith's once again expanded with an addition of the original building to the north. This addition contained 2 floors of above ground retail space. A portion of this expansion was converted to Goldsmith's Furniture Gallery in the late 1980s when the rest of the mall was built.

In 1986, Belz Enterprises began construction on the mall immediately to the west of Goldsmith's. The first floor of the mall was constructed below ground while the second floor was at ground level. The mall opened in 1988 with the anchors of Lord & Taylor and Goldsmith's.

Lord & Taylor closed its store in 1992. The former Lord & Taylor store became Dillards, which was formerly located in Poplar Plaza. In 1995, Dillards built a store expansion in the center court of the mall for the men's and children's store while the existing Dillards on the west end of the mall became the women's store.

In 2005, Federated Department Stores rebranded all of the Goldsmith's locations as Macy's.

This mall was home to the first Starbucks location in the state of Tennessee. The shop was closed in 2013 and relocated to the second level of Macy's. As of 2021 the mall hired The Woodmont Company to manage the property. Dillard's has also closed their separate men's and children's store in the center court of the mall as of 2021.

Anchors
Macy's (400,000 ft²) - Opened in 1961 (originally Goldsmith's). 3 floors, but only second and third floors open to public. Largest Macy's location in the region. 
Dillards (111,000 ft²) - Opened in 1992 (formerly Lord & Taylor). 2 floors. Was separated into men's and women's departments from 1995-2021.

Former Anchors
Men's Dillards - 1995-2021. 2 floors with a parking garage attached. Originally this was the center court of the mall that allowed the parking garage and the office building access to the rest of the mall. Closed in mid-2021.

References

External links
Oak Court Mall

Shopping malls in Tennessee
Buildings and structures in Memphis, Tennessee
Tourist attractions in Memphis, Tennessee
Shopping malls established in 1988
1988 establishments in Tennessee